The Hegang–Harbin Expressway, commonly referred to as the Heha Expressway is an expressway that connects the cities of Hegang, Heilongjiang, China, and Harbin, Heilongjiang. The expressway is a spur of G11 Hegang–Dalian Expressway.

The expressway connects the following cities, all of which are in Heilongjiang Province:
Hegang
Yichun
Suihua
Harbin

The expressway is currently complete from Yichun to Harbin and under construction from Hegang to Yichun.

Detailed Itinerary

References

Chinese national-level expressways
Expressways in Heilongjiang